Fynn Seidel (born 31 January 2004) is a German professional footballer who plays as a midfielder for Regionalliga Bayern club SpVgg Unterhaching.

Career
Seidel played for VfL 05 Hohenstein-Ernstthal and Oberlungwitzer SV in his youth, before joining the academy of Chemnitzer FC in 2015. In 2020, he joined the youth team of SpVgg Unterhaching, signing a three-year contract lasting until 30 June 2023. 

Seidel made his professional debut for Unterhaching's senior team in the 3. Liga on 27 January 2021, coming on as a substitute in the 76th minute for Lucas Hufnagel against VfB Lübeck. In doing so, he became the youngest player in the history of the 3. Liga at the age of 16 years and 362 days. This broke the previous record of 17 years and 18 days set by Viktor Zentrich on 1 July 2020. The away match finished as a 1–0 loss for Unterhaching.

References

External links
 
 
 
 

2004 births
Living people
German footballers
Association football midfielders
Chemnitzer FC players
SpVgg Unterhaching players
3. Liga players
Regionalliga players